The Apple iPod line has been upgraded many times, and each significant revision is called a "generation". Each new generation usually had more features and refinements while typically being physically smaller and lighter than its predecessor, while usually (but not always) retaining the older model's price tag. Notable changes included the touch-sensitive click wheel replacing the mechanical scroll wheel, use of color displays, and flash memory replacing hard disks.

The iPod Touch was the only product in Apple's iPod product line after the discontinuation of the iPod Nano and iPod Shuffle on July 27, 2017, after which Apple revised the storage and pricing for the iPod Touch with 32 and 128 GB of storage. On May 10, 2022, Apple officially announced the discontinuation of the iPod Touch, in effect ending the iPod product line as a whole.

Models

The software bundled with the first generation iPod was Macintosh-only, so Windows users had to use third-party updates like ephPod or XPlay to manage their music. When Apple introduced the second generation of iPods in July 2002, they sold two versions, one that included iTunes for Macintosh users and another that included Musicmatch Jukebox for Windows users. In October 2003, Apple released the Windows version of iTunes, and started selling iPods that included both Macintosh and Windows versions of iTunes so that they could be used with either platform. Current iPods no longer ship with iTunes, which must be downloaded from Apple's website.

In December 2004, Apple unveiled its first limited edition iPods, with either Madonna’s, Tony Hawk’s, or Beck’s signature or No Doubt's band logo engraved on the back for an extra US$50. On 26 October 2004, Apple introduced a special edition of its fourth generation monochrome iPod, designed in the color scheme of the album How to Dismantle an Atomic Bomb by Irish rock band U2. It had a black case with a red click wheel and the back had the engraved signatures of U2's band members. This iPod was updated alongside the iPod Photo and fifth generation iPod.

On October 13, 2006, Apple released a special edition 4 GB red iPod nano as part of the Product Red campaign. An 8 GB version was released three weeks later and both of them sold for the same price as the standard models. US$10 from each sale is donated to The Global Fund to Fight AIDS, Tuberculosis & Malaria. On September 5, 2007, Apple also added a Product Red iPod Shuffle model. They did not disclose how much will be donated to charity from this model. Apple also released Special Edition Harry Potter iPods to accompany the iPod Photo. These were engraved with the Hogwarts Crest on the back and were only available to purchasers of the Harry Potter audiobooks. They were updated when the fifth generation iPods were released, but were only available for a limited time.

Timeline of iPod models

See also
List of iOS, tvOS, and watchOS devices

References

External links
Official website

 
Apple Inc. lists
Electronics lists